Sworn Virgin is a 2015 internationally co-produced drama film directed by Laura Bispuri. It was screened in the main competition section of the 65th Berlin International Film Festival.

Plot 
The story takes place in Albania. In a rugged, impoverished world where women are treated as chattel, some women escape their hard, gender-determined fate by claiming the status of “sworn virgins” before a dozen male elders, after which they don male garb and live as men.

They are then granted the privilege to engage in all male activities such as carrying rifles and hunting, but they are prohibited from engaging in sexual activity with either gender. In Albania's remote mountain villages, this custom dates back at least a couple of centuries is still practiced. Though the custom is now fading, it remains a unique aspect of the cultural heritage of these villages.

Cast
 Alba Rohrwacher as Mark/Hana
 Flonja Kodheli as Lila
 Lars Eidinger as Bernhard
 Luan Jaha as Stjefen
 Bruno Shllaku as Gjergj
 Ilire Vinca as Katrina
 Drenica Selimaj as Little Hana
 Emily Ferratello as Jonida

Reception 
RogerEbert.com has rated it a 2 star. In summary it said that the movie lacks dramatic power and unexpected revelation, but its details and subtle developments, such as the evolving relationship between the main character and her niece, are the most winning aspects. The film's setting in a public pool highlights gender performance, but it does not delve into religion, which is an important aspect of conservative rural societies.

On Rotten Tomatoes it has a 71% critics score (as of February 2023).

On MetaCritic it got a score of 70.

See also
Balkan sworn virgins

References

External links

Additional reading 

 The last of Albania's 'sworn virgins' - story about real Albanian Sworn Virgins

2015 films
2015 drama films
2015 LGBT-related films
2015 directorial debut films
LGBT-related drama films
German drama films
Italian drama films
Swiss drama films
Kosovan drama films
2010s Italian-language films
Italian LGBT-related films
Albanian drama films
2010s German films